Il turno (The Turn) is a 1981 Italian comedy film directed by Tonino Cervi.

It is loosely based on the novel with the same name written by Luigi Pirandello.

Cast 

 Vittorio Gassman: Ciro Coppa 
 Laura Antonelli: Stellina 
 Paolo Villaggio: Don Pepe Alletto 
 Bernard Blier: Don marcantonio 
 Gianni Cavina: Renato 
 Turi Ferro: Don Diego Alcozér 
 Lila Kedrova: Maria 
 Giuliana Calandra: Rosa 
 Milena Vukotic: Elena
 Luigi Lodoli: Giulio 
 Tiberio Murgia: Paolo 
 Colette Shammah: Dana

References

External links

1981 films
Italian comedy films
1981 comedy films
Films based on works by Luigi Pirandello
Films based on Italian novels
Films directed by Tonino Cervi
1980s Italian films